Altai Kai (stylized) is an Altai folk band from the Altai Republic of the Russian Federation, founded by Urmat Yntaev in 1997. Their band name means Altaian Folklore. Their music features throat singing, and several native musical instruments, including the khomus and topshuur. Their music is often about the nature and history of Altai.

Performances 
 The John F. Kennedy Center for the Performing Arts (live internet broadcast) in Washington, D.C. in 2006.
 68th Annual National Folk Festival in Richmond, Virginia in 2006.
 Czech Philharmonic Orchestra, Dvořák hall (Altai Kai, Hradistan & Czech Philharmonic Orchestra) in Prague in 2007.
 Lope de Vega theatre (WOMEX and BBC-supported concert) in Sevilla in 2007.
 Royal Opera House (BBC live Altai Kai performance recording) in London in 2008.
 WOMAD Festival (BBC live broadcast) in Charlton Park in 2008.

Albums 
 Where Altai Is In Rise - Musical Traditions Of Altai People (2002)
 XXI Век (XXI Century) (2005)
 Khan Altai (2005)
 Made In USA (2006)
 XXI Century (Version II) (2006)
 Remix (2006)
 Altyn-Taiga (Golden Taiga) (2011)
 Altai Kabai (2013)
 Altai Tele (2017)

References 

 Band's website
 Band's page on Last.fm
 Band's page on Facebook
 Kai Kozhong video clip on YouTube
 Kara Suu video clip on YouTube
 Oino Oino Altai video clip on YouTube
 Pure Nature Music - Altai Kai Description and Current members

See also 
 Overtone singing

Altai music
Turkic music
Throat singing
Russian folk music groups